The Africa Report is an English-language quarterly magazine that focuses on African politics and economics.

History and profile
Created in 2005 by Paris-based Jeune Afrique Media Group, The Africa Report is edited by Africa Confidential's Patrick Smith. The company also publishes the monthly magazine Jeune Afrique.

Born from the desire of the Jeune Afrique Media Group to develop itself in the Anglo-Saxon world, The Africa Report launched a website in 2019 to gain visibility and become a reference media in Africa. It covers the economic, political, and social news of the continent.

Featuring a report by sector and a focus by country, each issue is produced by an independent editorial team led by Nicholas Norbrook, The Africa Report's managing editor since its creation.

With more than one million readers per month, The Africa Report implemented a paywall on its news website in 2021 to complement its quarterly print edition.
 
The Africa Report won the 2006, 2007 and 2012 Diageo Africa Business Reporting Award for Best Media as well as the 2007 award for Best Published Feature.

Following the death of the Group's founder Bechir Ben Yahmed on 3 May 2021, the management of The African Report is under supervision of Danielle Ben Yahmed.

Organization chart 
Danielle Ben Yahmed, Publisher

Crystal Orderson, Southern Africa Editor

Eromo Egbejule, West Africa Editor

Morris Kiruga, East Africa Editor

Alison Culliford, Chief Sub Editor

Nicholas Norbrook, Managing Editor

References

External links
Official website

2005 establishments in France
Political magazines published in France
English-language magazines
World magazines
Monthly magazines published in France
Magazines established in 2005
Magazines published in Paris
Africa-focused media